Padatik Natya Sangsad (Padatik theatre group)  is a Dhaka based Bangladeshi Bengali theatre group. To sustain the spirit of the Bangladesh Liberation War, the group was formed in 1978.

History 

Padatik began its journey on 21 January 1978 with a core team of spirited Dhaka University students and some former theatre workers of Kalantar Natyagosthi. The primary aim of this group was to uplift spirit, enrich culture and to sustain the spirit of the Bangladesh Liberation War (1971). The first drama to be staged by this group was Jasimuddin's Sojan Bandiyar Ghat. Following members started Padatik namely S.M. Solaiman, Anisuzzaman Manik, Abul Kashem Dulal, Abu Mohammad Murtaysh Kachi, Quamrul Hassan Swapan, Ulfat Rana, Selim S H Chowdhury, Golam Quddus & others. Ist Executive committee formed with Anisuzzaman Manik as president and abul Kashem Dulal as General Secretary. In 1980 Padatik formed another branch of this theatre group in Narayanganj, Bangladesh.[4][5] 
The troupe has produced popular plays like “Shojon Badiar Ghat”, “Tin Rostomer Goppo”, “Monoshar Pala”, “Maa”, Chandraboti", “Shey”, “Khetmojur Khoimuddin”, “Poramati”, “Khyapa Paglar Pyachal”, “Jol Balika” & “Dinlipi (Mime)”. 
Padatik promote original plays based on literary classics and rich folk heritage. The founding chief SM Solaiman, who had an affinity with folk culture.  The spirit of Liberation War shaped Bangladesh theatre.  Padatik Sangeet Sangsad, the musical wing of Padatik, in association with Kolkata-based cultural organization Mitali, has been arranging a Rabindra Sangeet talent hunt programme since 2005. Young talents from Bangladesh, West Bengal, Assam and Tripura [of India] participate in the competition. Padatik hold the ‘Padatik Ekushey Cultural Congress’ in Dhaka since 1998 and introduced 'Kachi Smriti Padak' in 2004 in memory of its founder member Abu Mohammad Murtaysh Kachi.

Festivals 
 Since 1999 the theatre group organizes Padatik Ekushey Cultural Congress every year on 21 February in the occasion of International Mother Language Day.
 Since 2003, the group also celebrates Choitro Sangkranti Utsab, eve of Bangla New year every year. Artists, activists and different cultural group from Bangladesh and India join these festivals.
 Since 2004 Padatik introduce "Kachi Memorial Award" in memory of its founder member Abu Mohammad Murtaysh Kachi with Padatik Drama Festival.

Productions

Stage plays

Street Plays 
(in alphabetical order)
 Khepa Paglar Peychal- Director: S.M. Solyman
 Ajker Sangbad - Director: Kamaluddin Nilu
 Bhulini Ekattor
 Bishwa Behayar Porikolpana - Director: Ziillur Rahman Jhon
 Choor - Director: Kazi Rafique
 Ekhono kalo Megh
 Hollabol - Director: Ziillur Rahman Jhon
 Machine - Director: Malay Kumar Paul
 Raja Canute - Director: Bahar Uddin Khelon
 Rongbaji
 Sari Sari Lash - Director: Kazi Rafique
 Taramon Bibi   - Director: Kazi Rafique

References

External links 
 

Bengali theatre groups
Theatre companies in Bangladesh